Ali Hedyeh-ye Olya (also Romanized as ‘Alī Hedyeh-ye ‘Olyā; also known as Alī Hedye Bala, ‘Alī Hedyeh, and ‘Alī Hedyeh-ye Bālā) is a village in Doreh Rural District, in the Central District of Sarbisheh County, South Khorasan Province, Iran. At the 2006 census, its population was 239, in 64 families.

References 

Populated places in Sarbisheh County